Candida dubliniensis is a fungal opportunistic pathogen originally isolated from AIDS patients. It is also occasionally isolated from immunocompetent individuals. It is of the genus Candida, very closely related to Candida albicans but forming a distinct phylogenetic cluster in DNA fingerprinting. It is most commonly isolated from oral cavities, and is also occasionally found in other anatomical sites.

Prevalence and epidemiology
Candida dubliniensis is cosmopolitan (found around the world), and has been described as a separate species in 1995. Retrospective studies have shown that previously it had been commonly identified as Candida albicans, with which C. dubliniensis is closely related and shares a number of characteristics.

One test for distinguishing C. dubliniensis from C. albicans, is laboratory culture of the organism at 42 °C. Most C. albicans strains grow at this temperature, whereas most C. dubliniensis isolates do not. There are also significant differences in the conditions that lead to the formation of chlamydospores between C. albicans and C. dubliniensis, although they are otherwise phenotypically very similar.

A European study of 2,589 isolates, that had originally been identified as C. albicans, revealed that 52 of them (2.0%) were C. dubliniensis. Most of these isolates were from oral or faecal specimens from HIV-positive patients, though one vaginal and two oral isolates were from healthy individuals. Another study in the United States surveyed 1,251 yeasts previously identified as C. albicans, and identified 15 isolates (1.2%) as C. dubliniensis. Most of these isolates were from immunocompromised individuals, such as AIDS, chemotherapy, or organ transplant patients. The majority of C. dubliniensis strains were recovered from respiratory, urine and stool specimens. The Memorial Sloan-Kettering Cancer Center also conducted several studies, both retrospective and prospective. In 974 germ-tube positive yeasts, 22 isolates (2.3%) from 16 patients were C. dubliniensis. All individuals were immunologically compromised with either malignancy or AIDS, and the isolates came from a variety of different sites. C. dubliniensis was also isolated from the mouths of 18% of patients with diabetes and who use insulin.

Antifungal susceptibility
In one study, all 20 C. dubliniensis isolates tested were susceptible to itraconazole, ketoconazole and amphotericin B.

Fluconazole
Many isolates of C. dubliniensis are sensitive to fluconazole. In one study, sixteen of twenty isolates were sensitive to fluconazole, while four were resistant. It has been hypothesized that C. dubliniensis possesses the ability to rapidly develop resistance to fluconazole, especially in patients on long-term therapy.

Stable fluconazole resistance could be induced in vitro by subjecting sensitive strains to increasing concentrations of this antifungal. This resistance is mediated by a multidrug transporter that can be mobilized rapidly in vitro on exposure to fluconazole.

Cases in America have shown the emergence of fluconazole-resistant C. dubliniensis. Three isolates were discovered in Texas, two of which were resistant (MIC, 64 µg/mL), and one of which demonstrated dose-dependent susceptibility (MIC, 16 µg/mL). Among C. dubliniensis isolates in HIV-positive patients in Maryland, most isolates were highly susceptible to fluconazole. A study of seventy-one isolates in Ireland showed that both the fluconazole-resistant and - susceptible strains were susceptible to itraconazole, amphotericin B, 5-fluorocytosine, experimental triazoles, voriconazole and echinocandin.

References

External links
 Doctor Fungus page about Candida dubliniensis

dubliniensis
Fungi described in 1995
Yeasts